Tomás de la Vega (born September 28, 1990 in Buenos Aires) is an Argentine rugby union footballer. He currently plays Flanker for Toronto Arrows in North America's Major League Rugby (MLR). He also represents Argentina internationally.

He was part of the Argentina squad that competed in the 2012 Rugby Championship.

References

External links
ESPN Profile
Los Pumas Player Profile
itsrugby.co.uk profile

1990 births
Rugby union players from Buenos Aires
Argentine rugby union players
Living people
Argentina international rugby union players
Pampas XV players
Rugby union flankers
Club Universitario de Buenos Aires rugby union players
Rugby union number eights
Toronto Arrows players
Provence Rugby players